Ian William McCulloch (born 11 June 1948) is a former Australian rules footballer who played with Fitzroy in the Victorian Football League (VFL) and East Perth in the West Australian Football League (WAFL).

Notes

External links 

Ian McCulloch's playing statistics from WAFL Footy Facts

Living people
1948 births
Australian rules footballers from Western Australia
Fitzroy Football Club players
East Perth Football Club players
East Perth Football Club coaches